Yohannes may refer to:Yuhuna
 Yohannes (given name)
 Yohannes I of Ethiopia (died 1682)
 Yohannes II of Ethiopia (1699–1769)
 Yohannes III of Ethiopia (1797–1873)
 Yohannes IV of Ethiopia (1837–1889)

See also
 John (given name)
 Johannes